Antoine Boyellau was Governor General of Pondicherry under the French East India Company.

References

Titles Held

18th-century French people
Governors of French India